Pharmacology & Therapeutics is a medical review journal published by Elsevier. It incorporates Pharmacology & Therapeutics. Part A: Chemotherapy, Toxicology and Metabolic Inhibitors and Pharmacology & Therapeutics. Part B: General and Systematic Pharmacology, both originally published by Oxford University Press.

The journal is included in the Index Medicus (MEDLINE).

Indexed by ISI Pharmacology & Therapeutics received an impact factor of 11.127 as reported in the 2016 Journal Citation Reports by Thomson Reuters, ranking it seven out of 256 journals in the category Pharmacology & Pharmacy.

The editor is Sam J. Enna, University of Kansas Medical Center, Kansas City.

External links

References

Pharmacology journals
Elsevier academic journals
Publications established in 1976
English-language journals
Monthly journals
Review journals